Maysville is an unincorporated community in Coshocton County, in the U.S. state of Ohio.

History
Maysville was laid out in 1837. The community was originally centered on a blacksmith's shop.

References

Unincorporated communities in Coshocton County, Ohio
1837 establishments in Ohio
Populated places established in 1837
Unincorporated communities in Ohio